Osio may refer to;

Marco Osio (born 1966), Italian footballer
Antonio Maria Osio (1800–1878), founder of the Mexican landgrant Rancho Punta de los Reyes Sobrante in Marin County, California, USA
Osio Sopra, a town in Italy
Osio Sotto, a town in Italy

See also

OS10 (disambiguation)